The Rock-O-Plane is an amusement park ride designed by Lee Eyerly in 1948 and manufactured by the Eyerly Aircraft Company of Salem, Oregon.

It is sometimes nicknamed "the cages" or "the eggs". Its shape is similar to that of a Ferris wheel, but with seats that are enclosed and rock and roll as the ride turns.  If the rocking builds sufficient momentum the seats will flip upside-down and end-over-end.  There is usually a wheel inside that participants can use to lock the seat and prevent it from rocking.  This can be used to make the ride less scary by ensuring that the seats don't rock too much; or to make it more intense by locking the seats at crucial points in the ride's revolution, causing the seats to flip upside down and spin erratically. The minimum rider height requirement is 36 inches.

In the UK many of these rides are still traveling and most were imported from the US in the 1980s. Some of these traveling examples have had their standard 'egg' shaped cages replaced with front-facing open cars. These rides are known as 'sky dancer', 'hi impact' and sometimes colloquially as an 'egg roller'. The ride packs down onto one trailer as the center pole folds down on a hydraulic ram. The arms all fold inwards and the cages are unbolted from them and secured to the side of the trailer. The paybox usually sits on the rear of the trailer.

This ride can be found in various amusement parks throughout North America including:
Santa Cruz Beach Boardwalk in Santa Cruz, California
All Star Adventures in Wichita, Kansas 
Arnolds Park Amusement Park in Arnolds Park, Iowa
Enchanted Forest Water Safari in Old Forge, New York 
Lakeside Amusement Park in Lakeside, Colorado 
Oaks Amusement Park in Portland, Oregon 
Sylvan Beach Amusement Park in Sylvan Beach, New York
Thomas Amusements in Newfoundland and Labrador, Canada

Incident
In 2016, the door to one of the cages opened on the ride at the Morton Pumpkin Festival.

See also
Loop-O-Plane
Roll-O-Plane

References

External links

Rock-O-Plane page at Ride Extravaganza 
Rock-O-Plane page at All The Fun of the Fair 
Rock-O-Plane page at Kansas Based Carnival 
Rock-O-Plane Pictures at Ultimate Rollercoaster 

Amusement rides
Upside-down amusement rides
Amusement rides introduced in 1948